The University of Dayton first fielded a football team in 1905. They remained independent of athletic conferences for most of their history, including the period from 1977 to 1992 when they joined Division III of the NCAA.  Beginning in 1993 they joined the Pioneer Football League in Division I-AA/FCS play as a founding member.

The Flyers have amassed a 687–377–25 (.642) record since 1905 and have won 2 National Championships as a member of Division III. UD has won 12 Conference Championships.

Seasons

Pre-2006 data taken from

Postseason facts
Years in Postseason: 12
DIII Post-Season Record: 16-9
DI Post-Season Record: 0-1
OVERALL PLAYOFF RECORD: 16-10

Championships
National Championships: 2 (1980, 1989)
National Runner-Up: 3 (1981, 1987, 1991)

References

 
Dayton Flyers
Dayton Flyers football seasons